The Nature Of Betrayal is the second album release by the band The Funeral Pyre.

Originally released by Creator Destructor Records, a Bay Area label, it had seen great success during its debut in late 2006. Despite being unsigned at the particular time, the band had scheduled over 100 shows in the Bay area alone, and was praised for the mood that they could convey using both aggressive death/black metal sounds, and the harmonies of a keyboard. It was also praised for its sound and songwriting, despite the band's young age.

This album has been heavily praised for its fuse of both black metal and death metal and the atmosphere created by keyboardist Daniella Jones' synthesizers, and drummer Alex Hernandez's use of blast beats throughout the album.

The album was re-released in March 2007 with a distribution deal by Prosthetic Records after 5 weeks of constant touring.

The artwork for this record "was created by Gustave Doré."

Track listing

Personnel
 James Joyce - all guitars
 Adam Campbell - bass guitar
 Alex Hernandez - drums
 Daniella Jones - keyboards
 John Strachan - vocals

References

2006 albums
The Funeral Pyre albums
Prosthetic Records albums